The Bournemouth Bobcats is an English American football team based in Bournemouth, Dorset competing in the first division of the British American Football Association's Southern Conference. The team's home ground is at Slades Farm, Bournemouth, BH10 4BU.

Early History 
The club was originally formed in 1986, winning the Budweiser Premier Bowl in 1987 and playing in the league's top division between 1988 and 1991 before folding.

Reformation 

The Bobcats reformed in 2009 and entered BAFA Community Leagues as an associate member in 2010. The newly formed Bobcats played 5 games (2-3) over the 2010 summer months, concluding with a 34-12 win over Bristol Apache away.

Recent history

2011 

In 2011, after losing their opening three matches the Bobcats bounced back against the Gloucester Banshees beating them both away then at home to go 2-3 with a new offensive co-ordinator. In the following games, the Bobcats lost away at South Wales and at home to the eventual Division Winners Reading in a close game. The Bobcats then had a fantastic win against the well established Cornish Sharks beating them at home 20-12. Another win against their main rivals the Bristol Apache at home and a loss in the final game to South Wales; the Bobcats ended their first season with a very respectable 4-6 record.

2012 

2012 saw the Bobcats re-enter the British leagues with a new head coach, Derek Burridge. It was an excellent inaugural season that ended up with an exceptional 4-6 record with wins against three out of the five clubs in the division.

2013 

For the 2013 season, Mark Newell took over the role as head coach and oversaw a disappointing year for the team with them ending up with a 1-9 season. The only win being a hard fought last game of the season against rookie team Swindon Storm resulting in a 14–13 win.

2015 

The 2015 season was successful in some ways and disappointing in others. Led by head coach Tim Iles, who took on a multitude of responsibilities , The Bobcats went 4-6 with wins at home and away against Portsmouth and Hastings. The away win at Hastings was one of the most courageous performances of the Bobcats who travelled light in squad numbers, had a number of key players either missing or playing both ways and also had to wait for an hour after one of the Bobcats players received treatment for a serious leg injury.

2015 Player Award Winner

2016 

The Bobcats 2016 season would turn out to be one of their most successful in the current period. Finishing with a strong 7-2 record and missing out on the play-offs by points difference.

2016 Player Award Winner

2017 

Having recruited strongly in the off-season the 2017 season did not take the course originally planned and serious injuries left an under sized Bobcats squad finishing with a disappointing 3-7 record.

2017 Player Award Winners

2018 

The 2018 season being more successful than the last but ended in a lopsided 3-4-1 but with the addition of some very talented rookies.

2018 Player Award Winners

2019 
The Bobcats had their most successful season since reforming. A 6-2 regular season record was enough to lead the Bobcats into the play-offs. Having put up big scores in the quarter final against Norwich Devils and then Essex Spartans in the semi final, they booked their place in the Britbowl XXIII South Division 2 Championship.

Unfortunately, the Bobcats lost a close encounter against the South Wales Warriors. However, with victory over Essex Spartans in the Playoff Semi Final, they had already secured promotion to Division 1. The 2020 season will see the Bobcats take on a new challenge of Division 1 football and back to a 10 game schedule.

Regular Season Results

Post Season Results 

*Played at neutral venue- New River Stadium, London.

2019 Player Award Winners

2020 

With the unfortunate outbreak of COVID-19, the 2020 regular season was cancelled.

2021
The Bobcats opted to take part in a regional Wessex Division which consisted of fellow Division 1 teams Portsmouth Dreadnoughts, Sussex Thunder, Rushmoor Knights and Premier Division team Solent Thrashers.

2021 Results

Wessex League Final Standings

2021 Player Award Winners

2022
The Bobcats lined up in their SFC 1 West Division against- South Wales Warriors, Portsmouth Dreadnoughts, Oxford Saints, Rushmoor Knights and Hertforshire Cheetahs.

2022 Results

Current Staff

Current Player Roster

External links 
  Official club website
 Official Facebook Page
 Bobcats history at britballnow.co.uk

American football teams in England
Sport in Dorset
Sport in Bournemouth
1986 establishments in England
American football teams established in 1986